The Gotham Independent Film Award for Outstanding Performance in a New Series is one of the annual Gotham Awards and was first awarded in 2021. 

It is a gender neutral award honoring performances in new television series.

Winners and nominees

2020s

See also
 Independent Spirit Award for Best Female Performance in a New Scripted Series

References

Outstanding Performance in a New Series
Awards established in 2021